Francesco Verri (11 June 1885 – 6 June 1945) was an Italian track cycling racer who won three gold medals at the 1906 Intercalated Games in  Athens. He later won the Six Days of Buffalo in 1915, teaming with Reggie McNamara.

References

1885 births
1945 deaths
Italian male cyclists
Italian track cyclists
Cyclists at the 1906 Intercalated Games
Sportspeople from Mantua
Cyclists from the Province of Mantua
Medalists at the 1906 Intercalated Games
Road incident deaths in Italy